Uchkent (Üçgent) is a rural locality (a selo) in Kumtorkalinsky District, Republic of Dagestan, Russia. The population was 3,702 as of 2010. There are 45 streets.

Geography 
Uchkent is located 21 km northwest of Korkmaskala (the district's administrative centre) by road. Novy Chirkey and Temirgoye are the nearest rural localities.

Nationalities 
Kumyks and Avars live there.

References 

Rural localities in Kumtorkalinsky District